This is a list of indigenous Canadian films, including First Nations, Métis and Inuit films.

0-9

A

B

C

D

E

F

G

H

I

J

K

L

M

N

O

P

Q

R

S

T

U

V

W

X

Y

References

Indigenous